John Tennent (born 27 August 1997) is a Scottish professional footballer who plays as a right-sided defender. After leaving Morton he signed with Junior side Largs Thistle.

He also played for Lowland League side Cumbernauld Colts, on loan from Greenock Morton.

Club career
Tennent turned professional when he signed a full-time contract in May 2014 with Greenock Morton in the Scottish League One as part of their new development squad.

He made his début for the club as an injury time substitute at Ibrox Stadium in March 2016.

Tennent agreed a new deal in May 2016 to keep him at the club for at least six more months.

On the final day of the summer transfer window, Tennent went on loan to Lowland Football League side Cumbernauld Colts. He was recalled in November from his loan spell.

Once the expiration of his short-term deal with Morton, he was released in Tennent signed with Ayrshire junior side Largs Thistle.

Honours
Morton
SPFL Development League West: Winners 2015–16

References

External links

Living people
Footballers from Paisley, Renfrewshire
Greenock Morton F.C. players
1997 births
Association football defenders
Scottish footballers
Scottish Professional Football League players
Cumbernauld Colts F.C. players
Scottish Junior Football Association players
Largs Thistle F.C. players
Lowland Football League players